Cyathea aristata is a species of fern in the family Cyatheaceae, native to Mexico and Colombia. It was first described by Domin in 1930.

References

aristata
Flora of Colombia
Flora of Mexico
Plants described in 1930